An overpressure protection system is one designed to protect an individual or group of individuals in a chemical, biological, radiological and nuclear (CBRN) environment. The two parts of the system are a safe area which as far as possible is sealed from possible contaminated air and an air filtration system which will filter out all possible toxins. Air pumps force clean air through the filters into the safe area such that the air pressure within the safe area will always be higher than that outside of the safe area. This pressure differential means that any flows of air will always be from the safe area to the outside, preventing the ingress of toxins.

The safe area may be as small as a protective hood for an individual, to a full body hazmat suit, to a fallout shelter or warship. Most modern armoured fighting vehicles will have such a system with the safe area being the crew and passenger compartments, these systems being first adopted to protect against poison gas attack. On a larger scale an overpressure system may be designed into the structure of a building or mobile prefabricated military structures to provide collective protection.

In a civilian context the same principles of filtration and positive pressure is used in positive pressure personnel suits.

See also
 Cleanroom

References

Chemical, biological, radiological and nuclear defense